Larry Fuller is an American choreographer, theatre director, dancer, and actor.

Fuller began his career as a dancer/actor, performing in the Carousel revival at New York City Center in 1957, and going on to appear in the original Broadway productions of "West Side Story" (as a Jet swing), The Music Man, Redhead,  Kean, Bravo Giovanni, Donnybrook, No Strings, and Funny Girl, with Barbra Streisand. He would go on to recreate the original Carol Haney choreography for the American touring and London West End productions of Funny Girl. Additional touring productions Fuller has directed and choreographed include "((The Music Man))", I Do! I Do!, Kismet, and On a Clear Day You Can See Forever.

In Europe, Fuller has directed and choreographed productions of West Side Story in Vienna and Nuremberg, created Jazz and the Dancing Americans for the Opera House Ballet in Graz, Austria and the Theatre an der Wien in ((Vienna)) and directed the European premieres of Leonard Bernstein's Candide and On the Town and George Gershwin's Girl Crazy. He also directed and choreographed on London's West End the mid-1980s hit multi-media musical "((Time))" and "((Marilyn, the Musical))" ,  European tour of Jesus Christ Superstar (1992).  In 1997 he directed and choreographed JFK: A Musical Drama in Dublin, Ireland.

Television audiences have seen Fuller's choreography on The Ed Sullivan Show, and he has staged and choreographed both the Tony and Emmy Awards telecasts twice.

Fuller's Broadway credits as a choreographer include On the Twentieth Century, Merrily We Roll Along, and A Doll's Life. He has been nominated for the Drama Desk Award for Outstanding Choreography twice, for his work in Sweeney Todd and Evita, which also garnered him a Tony nod. He won two NY Drama Desk Awards for "((Sweeney Todd))" and "((Evita))"and the L.A. drama desk award for his choreography in "((Evita))".  He choreographed the original West End production and directed and choreographed the 2004 US national tour as well.

Fuller had a romantic relationship with fellow choreographer/director Michael Bennett for many years. The 1996 documentary On Your Toes . . . The Making Of - Director/Choreographer Larry Fuller documents the making of the musical production "On Your Toes" with the Stuttgart Ballet Company in 1990.

References

External links

Back Stage West "The Charms of "Evita" - Director/choreographer Larry Fuller is seduced into revisiting one of his triumphs-but she's only first on the list."

American choreographers
American theatre directors
American male dancers
Swing pianists
American male stage actors
Year of birth missing (living people)
Living people
LGBT choreographers
21st-century pianists